Isaias (sometimes spelled Esaias, Jeaias or Jesaias), (? – 13 May 1332) was the Ecumenical Patriarch of Constantinople from 1323 to 1332.

The Byzantine Emperor Andronikos II Palaiologos had Isaias confined to the monastery section of the Magnaura school in Constantinople in 1327, possibly due to the Patriarch's support for the emperor's grandson, Andronikos III Palaiologos during the civil war of 1321–1328. Upon the overthrow of Andronikos II by his grandson on 23/14 May 1328, a delegation was sent to the monastery to retrieve Isaias. On his way back to the palace, Isaias was escorted not by the usual ecclesiastics, but by a troupe of musicians, dancing girls and comedians, one of whom had him so helpless with laughter that he almost fell off his horse.

References

14th-century patriarchs of Constantinople
1332 deaths